Joice M. Hall  (born 1943) is a Canadian artist from Alberta, now based in British Columbia. She is known primarily as a landscape painter.

Life 
Hall was born in Edmonton, Alberta, in 1943. She earned a diploma from the Alberta College of Art (now Alberta University of the Arts) in Calgary in 1965.

Hall lived in Calgary for almost 40 years. She and her husband, artist John Hall, also owned a home in San Miguel de Allende in central Mexico, where they spent half of the year during the 1990s. In 1999, they moved to West Kelowna, in the Okanagan region of British Columbia.

Career 
Hall has earned recognition for her landscape paintings, often using a panoramic format. A 2001 review in the Calgary Herald wrote that Hall's work appears to explore "the representation of male and female in nature and culture".

Hall's work has been featured in group exhibitions at the Mendel Art Gallery in Saskatoon, Saskatchewan (1976); the Agnes Etherington Art Centre in Kingston, Ontario (1977); and the Whyte Museum in Banff, Alberta (1979).

Hall's first solo exhibition was held at the Off Centre Centre in Calgary in 1981. The exhibit featured paintings of male nudes.

In 2000, Hall was elected to membership in the Royal Canadian Academy of Arts. In 2010, Patricia Ainsley curated for the Kelowna Art Gallery in British Columbia a 40-year retrospective exhibition of her work, titled Surreal, Real, Ideal: The Art of Joice M. Hall.

References 

1943 births
Living people
Artists from Edmonton
Canadian landscape painters
Members of the Royal Canadian Academy of Arts
20th-century Canadian painters
20th-century Canadian women artists
21st-century Canadian painters
21st-century Canadian women artists